Ioan D. Caragiani (11 February 1841 – 13 January 1921) was a Romanian folklorist and translator. He was one of the founding members of the Romanian Academy. Caragiani was an Aromanian.

References

1841 births
1921 deaths
People from Avdella
Aromanians from the Ottoman Empire
Romanian people of Aromanian descent
Romanian folklorists
Aromanian translators
Romanian translators
Founding members of the Romanian Academy